The 2015–16 Drake Bulldogs men's basketball team represented Drake University during the 2015–16 NCAA Division I men's basketball season. The Bulldogs, led by third year head coach Ray Giacoletti, played their home games at the Knapp Center and were members of the Missouri Valley Conference. They finished the season 7–24, 2–16 in Missouri Valley play to finish in last place. They lost in the first round of the Missouri Valley tournament to Missouri State.

Previous season 
The Bulldogs finished the season 9–22, 6–12 in MVC play to finish in seventh place. They lost in the first round of the Missouri Valley tournament to Bradley.

Departures

Incoming recruits

Roster

Schedule

|-
!colspan=9 style="background:#004477; color:#FFFFFF;"| Exhibition

|-
!colspan=9 style="background:#004477; color:#FFFFFF;"| Non-conference regular season

|-
!colspan=9 style="background:#004477; color:#FFFFFF;"| Missouri Valley Conference regular season

|-
!colspan=9 style="background:#004477; color:#FFFFFF;"| Missouri Valley tournament

References

Drake Bulldogs men's basketball seasons
Drake
Drake
Drake